Western Maryland, also known as the Maryland Panhandle, is the portion of the U.S. state of Maryland that typically consists of Washington, Allegany, and Garrett counties. The region is bounded by Preston County, West Virginia, to the west, the Mason–Dixon line (Pennsylvania) to the north, and the Potomac River and West Virginia to the south.  At one point, at the town of Hancock, the northern and southern boundaries are separated by just 1.8 miles, the narrowest stretch in the state.

Western Maryland is more rural than the Baltimore-Washington Metropolitan Area, where most of the state's population lives, and is noted for its mountainous terrain. The area is in the central Appalachians. Washington, Allegany, and Garrett counties are part of the Appalachian Regional Commission. The most populous community in Western Maryland is Hagerstown, located in Washington County, the most populous county in the region. Major highways in Western Maryland include Interstate Highways I-70, I-81 and I-68; U.S. Highways U.S. 11, U.S. 40, U.S. 40 ALT, U.S. 219 and U.S. 50; as well as various state highways.

Climate
The climate of Western Maryland is more akin to the mountains of northern West Virginia than to any other part of Maryland. Summers tend to be much cooler than in the rest of the state, and winters harsher. In comparison, Prince George's County, in the eastern part of the Washington, D.C., area, would previously average only  of snow and wintertime maxima exceeded  on a third of all days.

Below is climate data for Hagerstown, the largest city in Western Maryland, located in Washington County, the easternmost and lowest elevation county in Western Maryland.

Below is climate data for Oakland, located in Garrett County, the westernmost and highest elevation county in Western Maryland.

History

In 1748, the Western Maryland population was finally large enough to create a new county called Frederick County; at the time, the county stretched further west than it does today. In the earliest part of the colonial days, German immigrants that came from Pennsylvania had the most influence on the development of the plains and valleys of Western Maryland.

Named for George Washington, Washington County was founded in 1776, by division of Frederick County. The largest city in this county is Hagerstown. It was named after Jonathan Hager, a German settler.

In 1785, the city of Cumberland, which is in Allegany County, was established. The County was the home for many pioneers, when they would travel through the Cumberland Narrows, a 1,000 foot high gap. This gap forms the main pass through the Allegheny Mountains to the west. In the mid-18th century, English settlers came to the county and began to mine and create towns and farms. This county was important for transportation for many travelers heading west. They would pass through by many forms of transportation, including canal, train, and horse and buggy.

The westernmost county in the state, Garrett County, was the last part of Maryland to be settled in 1764. The county was founded in 1872 by John Work Garrett, the B&O Railroad president.

Appalachian development

The Appalachian Regional Development Act was created and passed in 1965 in an effort to correct the poverty issue, and the growing economic problems in the Appalachian region (13 States). According to the State of Maryland Appalachian Development Plan, the Act was passed because: (1) One in every three Appalachians lived in poverty; (2) Per capita income was 23% less than the US average; and (3) High unemployment and harsh living conditions had, in the 1950s, forced more than 2 million Appalachian people to leave their homes and seek work in other regions.

For the state of Maryland, this act was intended to bring awareness to the poverty levels of the Western Maryland counties. The program that was developed for this act was called the Appalachian Regional Commission (ARC). The main goal of the ARC was to improve the development of the economy, and bring this region into socioeconomic parity with the rest of the nation.

County population

According to the 2010 U.S. Census, the three westernmost counties of Maryland have a population of 252,614, accounting for 4.4% of the population of Maryland.

The most populated county is Washington County, which is home to approximately 147,430 people. Allegany County is the next most populated county with 75,087 people, while Garrett County is the least populated with 30,097 people.

Major communities
The following are some of the major cities in Western Maryland by county, in descending order of population, along with the city population of the 2020 census.

Washington County:
 Hagerstown (43,527)
 Boonsboro (3,336)
 Smithsburg (2,975)
 Williamsport (2,137)
 Hancock (1,546)

Allegany County:
 Cumberland (20,859)
 Frostburg (9,002)
 Westernport (1,888)

Garrett County:
 Mountain Lake Park (2,092)
 Oakland (1,925)

Economy

Western Maryland has a heavily agricultural economy. Its best-known crops are the apples grown in the Cumberland Valley, but corn, potatoes, beans, and varieties of green-leaf vegetables are grown as well. Mixed crop and livestock farms are common, and the region has a large number of dairy cattle farms.

Tourism

Tourism is very important to Western Maryland. There is a thriving tourist industry, and has been noted as having "potential for significant growth."

Western Maryland has a number of sites with significance for military history, particularly the Civil War. In 1862, Washington County was home to one of the Civil War's bloodiest single-day battles at Antietam National Battlefield.

Western Maryland, particularly Cumberland, is also home to transportation themed tourism. The Downtown Cumberland Historic District is a National Register Historic District, and Cumberland's Western Maryland Railway Station is a popular site.

Garrett County is also well known for its numerous state parks and outdoor activities. Places such as Deep Creek Lake in Garrett County are frequented by many visitors every year. The largest lake in Western Maryland is Deep Creek Lake in Garrett County. The 4,000 acre body of water is owned by the State of Maryland and is man made. Construction began in 1920 and the lake was filled by 1929. It was originally made to power a small scale hydroelectric plant, but was eventually turned into a tourist destination. The lake is currently managed for boating and fishing, although it still provides some water to generate electricity. The Deep Creek Lake State Park offers fishing piers, beach and swim area, covered pavilions, and opportunities for camping.

Maryland's only ski resort, Wisp Ski Resort, is located in Garrett County near Oakland.
Wisp Ski Resort is a huge tourism spot in Western Maryland as it is the only 4 season ski, golf, and recreational destination resort. This resort is approximately 172 acres which includes a mountain coaster, cross country skiing, snowmobiling, and more.

Sports
Sports teams in Western Maryland include the following:

Garrett County along the Savage River has played host to two ICF Canoe Slalom World Championships in 1989 and 2014.

Education

Colleges in Western Maryland include:
Allegany College of Maryland – Community College
Frostburg State University 
Garrett College - Community College
Hagerstown Community College - Community College

Potential state

In 2014, it was reported that some residents want the region to form a new state, which would include Garrett, Allegany, Washington, Frederick, and Carroll counties.  Local supporters of partitioning western Maryland (dubbed "the Western Maryland Initiative") cited a perception of political domination by the more populous eastern portion of the state, particularly with reference to such issues as gun control, taxation, and same-sex marriage.

See also

List of Appalachian Regional Commission counties

References

External links

Western Maryland Scenic Railroad Official Website for the Scenic Railroad and Canal Place.
Walkersville Southern Railroad website, see also Walkersville Southern RR wiki article
Western Maryland Tourism Website MDMountainside.com
Rocky Gap Resort Western Maryland Park with Lake & Golf Course
Heritage Days Festival
Canal Place
Queen City Striders Running Club
Western Maryland Mountain Bike Association
 Western Maryland Water Color Society

 
Regions of Maryland
Geography of Appalachia